Kaku Zakaria (also Romanized as Kākū Z̄akarīyā and Kākū Zakarīā; also known as Kākūs Kārī, Kākū Zakareyān, and Kākūz Qariya) is a village in Gol-e Cheydar Rural District, Sarshiv District, Marivan County, Kurdistan Province, Iran. At the 2006 census, its population was 155, in 38 families. The village is populated by Kurds.

References 

Towns and villages in Marivan County
Kurdish settlements in Kurdistan Province